Prithipal Singh Maini is an Indian orthopedic surgeon and the senior consultant surgeon at Sir Ganga Ram City Hospital, New Delhi. He is also a Consultant Orthopaedist at Sama Hospital, New Delhi.

Maini has managed several clinical and medical trials and has taught at a number of medical schools in India. He is an Emeritus Professor of the Maharshi Dayanand University and is the vice chairman of Pathfinder Health India Group, an organization promoting affordable healthcare. When Parkash Singh Badal, the chief minister of Punjab, suffered a fall in 2001, it was Maini who operated on him to correct the Femur fracture. He received the Order of Nishan-e-Khalsa honor from the chief minister of Punjab in 2001. The Government of India awarded him the third highest civilian honour of the Padma Bhushan, in 2007, for his contributions to Indian medicine.

See also 
 Sir Ganga Ram Hospital (India)

References

External links 
 

Recipients of the Padma Bhushan in medicine
Year of birth missing (living people)
Indian orthopedic surgeons
Indian medical academics
Medical doctors from Punjab, India
Living people
20th-century Indian medical doctors
20th-century surgeons
Maharshi Dayanand University